The 2004 Ms. Olympia contest 
is an IFBB professional bodybuilding competition and part of Joe Weider's Olympia Fitness & Performance Weekend 2004 that was held on October 29, 2004, at the Mandalay Bay Arena in Paradise, Nevada. It was the 25th Ms. Olympia competition held. Other events at the exhibition include the Mr. Olympia, Fitness Olympia, and Figure Olympia contests.

Prize money
1st $10,000
Total: $61,000

Weight-in
Heavyweights over 135 pounds:

 Yaxeni Oriquen-Garcia - 
 Betty Pariso - 
 Bonny Priest - 
 Betty Viana-Adkins - 
 Lisa Aukland - 
 Lenda Murray - 
 Iris Kyle - N/A (missed the weigh-in)

Lightweights up to 135 pounds:

 Marja Lehtonen - 	
 Desiree Ellis - 
 Vilma Caez - 
 Joanna Thomas - 
 Valentina Chepiga - 
 Nancy Lewis - 
 Mah Ann Mendoza - 
 Denise Masino - 
 Dayana Cadeau -

Results

Scorecard

Comparison to previous Olympia results:
+1 - Iris Kyle
-1 - Lenda Murray
Same - Yaxeni Oriquen
+2 - Betty Pariso-Carmichael
+1 - Betty Viana-Adkins
+1 - Dayana Cadeau
+1 - Denise Masino
+2 - Nancy Lewis
+3 - Joanna Thomas
-6 - Valentina Chepiga

Attended
11th Ms. Olympia attended - Lenda Murray
7th Ms. Olympia attended - Yaxeni Oriquen-Garcia
6th Ms. Olympia attended - Iris Kyle and Nancy Lewis
5th Ms. Olympia attended - Dayana Cadeau
4th Ms. Olympia attended - Fannie Barrios and Angela Debatin
3rd Ms. Olympia attended - Kim Harris, Betty Pariso-Carmichael, and Betty Viana-Adkins
2nd Ms. Olympia attended - Denise Masino and Joanna Thomas
1st Ms. Olympia attended - Lisa Aukland, Vilma Caez, Desiree Ellis, Marja Lehtonen, Mah Ann Mendoza, and Bonny Priest
Previous year Olympia attendees who did not attend - Juliette Bergmann, Vickie Gates, Kim Harris, Rosemary Jennings, Helle Trevino, and Cathy LeFrançois

Notable events
 Lenda Murray was dethroned of her Ms. Olympia title this year by Iris Kyle, who won her 1st Ms. Olympia. Dayana Cadeau wins her 1st lightweight Ms. Olympia title.
 This was the first Ms. Olympia since the 1980 Ms. Olympia to include lat spreads in compulsory posing routines.
 This was Lenda Murray's last Olympia before her retirement.
 The 2004 Ms. Olympia was featured in the 2005 documentary Supersize She.
 The music played during the heavyweight posedown was Move Somethin by LL Cool J, Word Up by Korn, and Frantic (instrumental) by Metallica.

2004 Ms. Olympia Qualified

See also
 2004 Mr. Olympia

References

Ms Olympia, 2004
2004 in bodybuilding
Ms. Olympia
Ms. Olympia
History of female bodybuilding